Rahaei (meaning Deliverance or Liberation in English) is an Iranian film by the director Rasul Sadremali. Sadremali also co-wrote the script. The film is set during the Iran-Iraq war, and is an early example of Sacred Defence cinema. It was released in 1982/83.

References

Iranian war films
1983 films
Persian-language films
Iran–Iraq War films
1980s war films